Jeremy Theobald is a British actor best known for his portrayal of "The Young Man", the main character in Christopher Nolan's 1998 major picture debut Following, and for which Theobald was also a producer. Filming was scheduled around their day jobs. Jonathan Romney, writing in the New Statesman, noted that "Nolan and his cast are terrific finds: I wouldn't normally say this to struggling artists, but they might want to give up their day jobs."

Theobald also appeared in Larceny, a short film shot by Nolan while in the UCLU Film Society, and Doodlebug, another short film by Nolan. Theobald also had a small role as the "Younger Gotham Water Board Technician" in the Nolan feature Batman Begins. As with many British actors, he has also had a part in an episode of ITV's The Bill.

Filmography

References

External links

English male film actors
English male television actors
English editors
Alumni of University College London
Living people
Year of birth missing (living people)